A by-election was held for the New South Wales Legislative Assembly electorate of Kahibah on 13 April 1957 because of the death of Tom Armstrong.

Dates

Result

Tom Armstrong died.

See also
Electoral results for the district of Kahibah
List of New South Wales state by-elections

References

1957 elections in Australia
New South Wales state by-elections
1950s in New South Wales